A list of poems by Robert E. Howard (1906–1936), an American writer and poet in early 20th century Texas. His love of poetry came from being read to by his mother at a young age. However, his attempts to make a living by poetry were unsuccessful and he is today most remembered for his short stories and fiction. Nevertheless, Howard wrote hundreds of poems; many were published within his lifetime and the others published after his 1936 suicide.

Key

The lack of information in a column does not necessarily mean that the information does not exist, only that verifiable information is not currently available. For example, the lack of publication information does not necessarily mean that a poem has not been published to date, nor does the lack of a definite note about the public domain indicate that a poem is still under copyright.

This table may be sorted by different columns by clicking on the icon in the appropriate column.  Clicking the icon again will alternate between ascending and descending order.

Additional notes

Title/Alternative title: Some poems are known by multiple titles.  Alternative titles are shown in the column of the same name. Every effort has been made to list full information at all entries for each title, to save the user time in scrolling. Occasionally, alternative titles appear consecutively, in which case the second entry will follow without additional information, shown in a darker gray on the table.  In other cases, some poems were not titled by Howard or the original title has not survived. Some poems have been given tentative titles after Howard's death; this is indicated in the Notes column. Where multiple titles exist, they have been listed alphabetically by their various designations following the word "Untitled."  Some pieces of poetry were used by Howard as epigraphs within his stories.  listed these poems under the title of the short story rather than the title of the poem itself, so the poems are listed under those titles as well.  With epigraphs, the first publication information given in this table is that of the poem's first printing separated from the story.

Lines: The number of lines in the poem.

Source text: Links given in the Source Text column are to copies of the poem in online libraries (where available). For ease of browsing the table, these links are preceded by a small icon. For example,  for poems on Wikisource.

References: Bibliographic references are given in the final column of each row.  The exception to this is the Notes column; as notes may come from diverse sources, or from a separate part of one of the main sources, each individual note is followed by its own reference.

Poetry
{| class="wikitable sortable"
|-
! width="15%" | Title
! width="3%"  | Lines
! width="15%" | Opening line
! width="13%" | Place of publication
! width="7%"  | Publication date
! width="8%"  | Alternative title(s)
! width="8%"  | Source text
! width="21%" | Notes
! width="10%" | References
|-
| "I am a Devon oak"  || 20 || I am a Devon oak || A Rhyme of Salem Town and Other Poems || 2002 || Devon Oak; Untitled ("I am a Devon oak") ||  || Tentative title  || 
|-
| "I am an actor ..." || 12 || I am an actor and have been an actor from birth || A Rhyme of Salem Town and Other Poems || 2002 || Actor, The; Untitled ("I am an actor ...") ||  || Tentative title  || Thom, Herman & Woods, § A
|-
|  I am MAN from the primal, I  || 7 || I am MAN from the primal, I || The Last of the Trunk Och Brev I Urval || 2007-03 Mar 2007 || Untitled: I am MAN from the primal, I ||  Wikisource  || Letter: Tevis Clyde Smith, c. March 1928 ; PD || 
|-
|  I am the Spirit of War! || 9 || I am the Spirit of War! || The Last of the Trunk Och Brev I Urval || 2007-03 Mar 2007 || Untitled: I am the Spirit of War! ||  Wikisource  || Letter: Tevis Clyde Smith, January 30, 1925 ; PD || 
|-
|  I Call the Muster of Iron Men ||  || I call the muster of iron men || Argosy All-Story Weekly|| July 20, 1929 || Untitled: ("I call the muster of iron men") || || From an early draft of the short story "Crowd-Horror"; titled with the first line in COLLECTED POETRY ||
|-
| "I can recall a quiet sky ..." || 8 || I can recall a quiet sky once more || The Howard Collector #5 || 1964-06-21 Summer 1964 || Dawn in Flanders, A; Untitled ("I can recall a quiet sky ...") ||  ||  || 
|-
| "I carved a woman out of marble when" || 14 || I carved a woman out of marble when || Poet's Scroll || 1929-01 Jan 1929 || Flaming Marble; Untitled ("I carved a woman out of marble when") ||  Wikisource || PD; Pen name: Patrick Howard  || 
|-
| "I caught Joan alone upon her bed" || 4 || I caught Joan alone upon her bed || A Rhyme of Salem Town and Other Poems || 2002 || Prelude; Untitled ("I caught Joan alone upon her bed") ||  || Tentative title  || 
|-
| "I cut my teeth on toil and pain" || 12 || I cut my teeth on toil and pain || The Ghost Ocean and Other Poems of the Supernatural || 1982 || When the Glaciers Rumbled South; Untitled ("I cut my teeth on toil and pain") ||  || Tentative title  || 
|-
|  I do not sing of a paradise  || 4 || I do not sing of a paradise || The Collected Letters of Robert E. Howard, Volume 1: 1923-1929 || 2007-06 Jun 2007 || Untitled: ("I do not sing of a paradise") ||   Wikisource  || Letter: Tevis Clyde Smith, c. January 1928 ; PD || 
|-
| "If life was a thing that money could buy" || 2 || If life was a thing that money could buy || The Collected Letters of Robert E. Howard, Volume 1: 1923-1929 || 2007-06 Jun 2007 ||Untitled: ("If life was a thing that money could buy") ||  ||  Letter: Tevis Clyde Smith, ca. October 1927; contained in the story "The Fastidious Fooey Mancucu"; parody of an old saying whose second line is usually some variant of "The rich would live and the poor would die"  ||  
|-
|  I hate the man who tells me that I lied  || 24 || I hate the man who tells me that I lied || The Collected Letters of Robert E. Howard, Volume 1: 1923-1929 || 2007-06 Jun 2007 || Untitled: I hate the man who tells me that I lied ||   Wikisource || Letter: Tevis Clyde Smith, c. November 1928 ; PD || 
|-
| "I heard the drum as I went ..." || 14 || I heard the drum as I went down the street || A Rhyme of Salem Town and Other Poems || 2002 || Drum, The; Untitled ("I heard the drum as I went ...") ||  || Tentative title  || 
|-
|  I hold all women are a gang of tramps  || 10 || I hold all women are a gang of tramps || The Last of the Trunk Och Brev I Urval || 2007-03 Mar 2007 || Untitled: I hold all women are a gang of tramps ||   Wikisource || PD || 
|-
|  I knocked upon her lattice — soft! || 8 || I knocked upon her lattice — soft! || Lewd Tales || 1987 || Untitled: I knocked upon her lattice — soft! ||  || Letter: Tevis Clyde Smith, c. March 1929 ; From: Songs of Bastards, Act 1, Scene 1 || 
|-
|  I lay in Yen's opium joint  || 7 || I lay in Yen's opium joint || The Last of the Trunk Och Brev I Urval || 2007-03 Mar 2007 || Untitled: I lay in Yen's opium joint ||  Wikisource || Letter: Tevis Clyde Smith, January 30, 1925 ; PD || 
|-
| I Praise my Nativity || 10 || Oh, evil the day that I was born, like a tale that a witch has told  || Fantasy Book #23 || 1987-03 Mar 1987 ||  ||  || Letter: Tevis Clyde Smith, undated  || 
|-
| "I saw the grass on the hillside bend" || 16 || I saw the grass on the hillside bend || Weirdbook #12 || 1977 || Dance Macabre; Untitled ("I saw the grass on the hillside bend") ||  || Tentative title  || 
|-
| "I stand in the streets of the city" || 8 || I stand in the streets of the city || Night Images || 1976 || King of the Ages Comes, The; Untitled ("I stand in the streets of the city") ||  || Tentative title  || 
|-
|  I tell you this my friend ... || 9 || I tell you this my friend ... || The Last of the Trunk Och Brev I Urval || 2007-03 Mar 2007 || Untitled: I tell you this my friend ... ||  Wikisource  || Letter: Tevis Clyde Smith, August 6, 1925 ; PD || 
|-
| "I too have strode those white-paved roads" || 4 || I too have strode those white-paved roads that run || The Howard Collector #17 || 1972-09-21 Autumn 1972 || Roads; Untitled ("I too have strode those white-paved roads") ||  || Originally untitled  || 
|-
| "I was a chief of the Chatagai" || 21 || I was a chief of the Chatagai || Night Images || 1976 || Thousand Years Ago, A; Untitled ("I was a chief of the Chatagai") ||  || Tentative title  || 
|-
| "I was a prince of China, lord of a million spears ..." || 18 || I was a prince of China, lord of a million spears || Always Comes Evening || 1957 || Prince and Beggar; Untitled ("I was a prince of China, lord of a million spears ...") ||  || Originally untitled  || 
|-
| "I, was I there" || 10 || I, was I there || A Rhyme of Salem Town and Other Poems || 2002 || Was I There?; Untitled ("I, was I there") ||  || Tentative title  || 
|-
| "I was once, I declare, a grog-shop man" || 28 || I was once, I declare, a grog-shop man || Shadows of Dreams || 1989 || Ballad of Beer, A; Untitled ("I was once, I declare, a grog-shop man") ||  || Letter: Tevis Clyde Smith, c. July 1930 ; Originally untitled  || Thom, Herman & Woods, § B
|-
| Illusion || 26 || I stood upon surf-booming cliffs || The Daniel Baker Collegian || 1926-03-15 15 March 1926 ||  ||  Wikisource || PD || 
|-
|  I'm more than a man... ||  || I'm more than a man ... || n/a || n/a || Untitled: I'm more than a man ... ||  || From the draft of the story Yellow Laughter ; Never published  || 
|-
| In the Ring || 47 || Over the place the lights go out || Robert E. Howard's Fight Magazine #4 || 1996-10 Oct 1996 || Untitled("Over the place the lights go out") ||  || Tentative title  || 
|-
| Incident of the Muscovy-Turkish War, An || 14 || Many were slaughtered in that final charge || A Rhyme of Salem Town and Other Poems || 2002 ||  ||  ||  || 
|-
|  Insomnia  ||  ||  || n/a || n/a ||  ||  || Lost || Thom, Herman & Woods, § C
|-
| Invective || 4 || There burns in me no honeyed drop of love || Always Comes Evening || 1957 || Untitled ("There burns in me ...") ||  "Invective" ||  || 
|-
| Invocation || 14 || Break down the world and mold it once again! || n/a || n/a ||  ||  || Part 5 of 5 in the Black Dawn cycle ; Never published separately  || 
|-
| The Invocation || 4 || Baal, lord Baal, of the ebon throne || Yesteryear #4 || 1989-10 Oct 1989 ||  ||  || Letter: Tevis Clyde Smith, c. February 1929 ; First poem in the cycle "The Mysteries" ||  
|-
| Iron Harp, The [poem cycle]|| 134 || 1. The blind black shadows reach inhuman arms / 2. Now in the gloom the pulsing drums repeat / 3. Ten million years beyond the sweep of Time / 4. The great black tower rose to split the stars / 5. A roar of battle thundered in the hills || The Last of the Trunk Och Brev I Urval || 2007-03 Mar 2007 || Echoing Shadows; Voices of the Night ||  || A group of five poems: "The Voices Waken Memory" (24 lines); "Babel" (19 lines); "Laughter in the Gulfs" (18 lines);  "Moon Shame" (34 lines); and "A Crown for a King" (39 lines); Letter: Tevis Clyde Smith, undated, beginning "The Seeker thrust ..."; Does NOT include the individual poem "The Iron Harp," which is, confusingly, the fourth poem in the BLACK DAWN cycle! || 
|-
| Iron Harp, The (2) || 32 || They sell brown men for gold in Zanzibar  || n/a || n/a ||  ||  || Part 4 of 5 in the Black Dawn cycle—NOT part of the "Iron Harp" poem cycle! ; Never published separately  || 
|-
|  The iron harp that Adam christened Life  || 18 || The iron harp that Adam christened Life || The Collected Letters of Robert E. Howard, Volume 1: 1923-1929 || 2007-06 Jun 2007 || Untitled: The iron harp that Adam christened Life ||  Wikisource  || Letter: Tevis Clyde Smith, c. April 1929 ; PD || 
|-
| Isle of Hy-Brasil, The || 52 || There's a far, lone island in the dim, red West || The Ghost Ocean and Other Poems of the Supernatural || 1982 || Hy-Brasil ||  || Shares lines with Ships  || 
|-
| Ivory in the Night || 8 || Maidens of star and of moon || The Last of the Trunk Och Brev I Urval || 2007-03 Mar 2007 ||  ||  Wikisource || Letter: Tevis Clyde Smith, c. March 1928 ; PD || 
|-
| Jack Dempsey || 24 || Through the California mountains  || The Right Hook, vol. 1, #2 || 1925 ||  ||  Wikisource || PD || 
|-
| Jackal, The || 15 || Lean is the life that the jackal leads || Omniumgathum || 1976 ||  ||  ||  || 
|-
| "A jackal laughed from a thicket still ..." || 24 || A jackal laughed from a thicket still, the stars were haggard pale || Witchcraft & Sorcery || 1971-05 May 1971 || Flight; Untitled ("A jackal laughed from a thicket still ...") ||  || Letter: Tevis Clyde Smith, c. September 1927, earlier, shorter version  || 
|-
|  James J. Jeffries  ||  ||  || n/a || n/a ||  ||  || Lost || Thom, Herman & Woods, § C
|-
|  Jimmy Barry  ||  ||  || n/a || n/a ||  ||  || Lost || Thom, Herman & Woods, § C
|-
|  Joe Gans  ||  ||  || n/a || n/a ||  ||  || Lost || Thom, Herman & Woods, § C
|-
| John Brown || 24 || You stole niggers, John Brown  || Shadows of Dreams || 1989 ||  ||  || Letter: Tevis Clyde Smith, c. May 1932 ;the first of "Three Sketches" || 
|-
| John Kelley || 30 || I hesitate to name your name  || The Collected Letters of Robert E. Howard, Volume 2: 1930-1932 || 2007-10 Oct 2007 ||  ||  Wikisource || Letter: Tevis Clyde Smith, c. May 1932 ; PD; the third of "Three Sketches" || 
|-
| John L. Sullivan || 36 || Bellowing, blustering, old John L.  || The Right Hook, vol. 1, #2 || 1925 ||  ||  Wikisource ||  || 
|-
| John Ringold || 14 || There was a land of which he never spoke || The Howard Collector #5 || 1964-06-21 Summer 1964 ||  ||  ||  || 
|-
|  The Jubilee || 8 || There was ham and lamb || The Collected Letters of Robert E. Howard, Volume 1: 1923-1929 || 2007-06 Jun 2007 || Gilhooley's Supper Party; ||  || Mnemonic reconstruction of "Gilhooley's Supper Party"; Letter: Robert W. Gordon, March 17, 1927; NOT INCLUDED IN COLLECTED POETRY ||
|-
| Ju-ju Doom || 14 || As a great spider grows to monstrous girth || A Rhyme of Salem Town and Other Poems || 2002 || Untitled ("As a great spider grows to monstrous girth") ||  || Tentative title  || 
|-
|  Kabrane the Greek  ||  ||  || n/a || n/a || THE HOUSE OF HELL ||  || Lost; the two titles are listed as alternatives in the Otis Adelbert Kline agency's list of Howard poems still unaccounted for || Thom, Herman & Woods, § C
|-
|  Kandahar  ||  ||  || n/a || n/a ||  ||  || Lost || Thom, Herman & Woods, § C
|-
|  Keep women, thrones and kingly lands  || 4 || Keep women, thrones and kingly lands || The Collected Letters of Robert E. Howard, Volume 1: 1923-1929 || 2007-06 Jun 2007 || Untitled: Keep women, thrones and kingly lands ||   Wikisource || Letter: Tevis Clyde Smith, c. January 1928 ; PD || 
|-
| Kelly the Conjure-man || 4 || There are strange tales told when the full moon shines || Echoes From An Iron Harp || 1972 ||  ||  || Epigraph: Kelly the Conjure-man  || 
|-
| Keresa, Keresita || 24 || Keresa, Keresita || Shadows of Dreams || 1989 || Untitled ("Keresa, Keresita") ||  || Letter: Tevis Clyde Smith, c. March 1928  || 
|-
| Kid Lavigne is Dead || 28 || Hang up the battered gloves; Lavigne is dead || The Ring || 1928-06 Jun 1928 ||  ||  Wikisource || PD || 
|-
| King Alfred Rides Again || 20 || I marched with Alfred when he thundered forth || Poet's Scroll || 1929-08 Apr 1929  || Dreaming on Downs ||  Wikisource || Tentative title  || 
|-
| King and the Mallet, The || 28 || Long golden-yellow banners break the sky || The Junto || 1929-07 Jul 1929 ||  ||  ||  || 
|-
| King and the Oak, The || 24 || Before the shadows slew the sun the kites were soaring free || Weird Tales || 1939-02 Feb 1939 ||  ||  "The King and the Oak" || There are two versions of this poem, the published one and a slightly longer draft version  || 
|-
| King Bahthur's Court || 106 || When the clamor of the city ... || The Collected Letters Of Robert E. Howard, Volume 3: 1933–1936|| n/a || 2008 ||  || A play, written entirely in verse || 
|-
|  King Kelka Rode From Komahar  ||  ||  || n/a || n/a ||  ||  || Lost || Thom, Herman & Woods, § C
|-
| King of the Ages Comes, The || 8 || I stand in the streets of the city || Night Images || 1976 || Untitled ("I stand in the streets of the city") ||  || Tentative title  || 
|-
| King of the Sea || 14 || Neptune was king of old || A Rhyme of Salem Town and Other Poems || 2002 ||  ||  ||  || 
|-
| King of Trade, The || 8 || There ere the mighty hosts might clash their swords || A Rhyme of Salem Town and Other Poems || 2002 ||  ||  || Incomplete, only the final eight lines survive / || 
|-
| Kings of the Night || 4 || The Caesar lolled on his ivory throne || Always Comes Evening || 1957 || Song of Bran, The ||  || Epigraph: Kings of the Night  || 
|-
| Kiowa's Tale, The || 28 || All day I lay with the sun at my back || Fantasy Crosswinds #1 || 1974-11-01 1 November 1974 ||  ||  ||  || 
|-
| Kissing of Sal Snooboo, The || 20 || A bunch of girls were whooping it up || The Tattler || 1925-1-6 6 January 1925 ||  ||  Wikisource || A parody of "The Shooting of Dan McGrew" by Robert W. Service /; PD || 
|-
| Kolumbar, Piper of Sadness ||  ||  || n/a || n/a ||  ||  || Lost || Thom, Herman & Woods, § C
|-
| Krakorum || 4 || A thousand years ago great Genghis reigned || A Rhyme of Salem Town and Other Poems || 2002 || Untitled ("A thousand years ago great Genghis reigned") ||  || Tentative title ; An early work ; An introduction by Howard states that he was 17 when he wrote this poem  || 
|-
| Kublai Khan || 8 || Who hath heard of Kublai Khan || The Golden CaliphThe Last Celt || 1922-01 1922/19231976 ||  ||  || Conflict: , The Last Celt, 1976/, The Golden Caliph, 1922/23; An early work  || 
|-
| Ladder of Life, The || 4 || Life is ladder of cynical years || A Rhyme of Salem Town and Other Poems || 2002 || Untitled ("Life is a ladder ...") ||  || Tentative title  || 
|-
| Lady's Chamber, A || 17 || Orchid, jasmine and heliotrope || American Poet || 1929-04 Apr 1929 ||  ||  Wikisource || Pen name: Patrick Howard /; PD || 
|-
|  Lalun of Lucknow  ||  ||  || n/a || n/a ||  ||  || Lost || Thom, Herman & Woods, § C
|-
| Lament For Jesse James || 4 || It wuz on a starry night, in the month of July || The Howard Collector #6 || Spring 1965 || Alternate title: Untitled ("It wuz on a starry night, in the month of July ..."); Title is Howard's only to the extent that it is referred to thus in the text. ||   || A barroom song taken from the Sonora Kid story "Knife, Bullet and Noose" (aka "Knife, Gun and Noose"),
Variation on a very common theme, probably with adjustments by Howard.  Probably never published separately. || 
|-
|  The Land of A Grey Dawn  ||  ||  || n/a || n/a ||  ||  || Lost || Thom, Herman & Woods, § C
|-
| Land of Mystery, The || 15 || Ancient of nations as the pyramid || n/a || n/a ||  ||  || Epigraph: The Land of Mystery ; Never published separately  || 
|-
| Land of the Pioneer || 8 || The wild bees hum in the tangled vines || A Rhyme of Salem Town and Other Poems || 2002 || Untitled ("The wild bees hum ...") ||  || Tentative title ; An early work  || 
|-
| Last Day, The || 14 || Hinged in the brooding west a black sun hung || Weird Tales || 1932-03 Mar 1932 ||  ||  || Similar to The Last Hour ; Letter: Tevis Clyde Smith, c. November 1931  || 
|-
| Last Hour, The || 14 || Hinged in the brooding west a black sun hung || Weird Tales || 1938-06 Jun 1938 ||  ||  "The Last Hour" || Similar to The Last Day ; Fifth poem of five from the  Sonnets Out of Bedlam cycle;  || 
|-
| The Last Ride (aka "Boot Hill Payoff")  Contains an embedded mnemonic reconstruction of "Brady" (q.v.).  The story is a collaboration with Chandler Whipple (Robert Enders Allen), who wrote chapters 1–6, then turned it over to Howard to finish.
|-
| Last Words He Heard, The || 14 || The chariots were chanting  || Shadows of Dreams || 1989 || Untitled ("The chariots were chanting ...") ||  || Letter: Tevis Clyde Smith, c. December 1928  || 
|-
| Laughter || 2 || Laughter's the lure of the gods; therefore must ye laugh  || The Last of the Trunk Och Brev I Urval || 2007-03 Mar 2007 ||  ||  Wikisource || Letter: Tevis Clyde Smith, April 14, 1926 ; PD || 
|-
| Laughter in the Gulfs || 18 || Ten million miles beyond the sweep of Time || Always Comes Evening || 1957 || An Echo of Laughter in the Gulfs; Voices of the Night ||  "Laughter in the Gulfs" || Poem 3 of the Voices of the Night cycle ; Letter: Tevis Clyde Smith, undated  || 
|-
|  Laughter in the Night  ||  ||  || n/a || n/a ||  ||  || Lost || Thom, Herman & Woods, § C
|-
| Legacy of Tubal-Cain, The || 10 || "No more!" they swear; I laugh to hear them speak || The Howard Collector #18 || 1973-09-21 Autumn 1973 || Untitled ("'No more!' they swear ...") ||  || Originally untitled  || 
|-
| Legend || 8 lines, plus a 142-word prose introduction || Against the blood red moon a tower stands ||The Last of the Trunk Och Brev I Urval || 2007-03 Mar 2007 || Untitled: Against the blood red moon a tower stands  ||  Wikisource || Letter: Tevis Clyde Smith, c. Aug/Sep 1927 ; PD || 
|-
| Legend, A || 14 || I was a swordsman in the Pharaoh's days || Writer of the Dark || 1986 ||  ||  ||  || 
|-
| Legend of Faring Town, A || 28 || Her house, a moulting buzzard on the Hill || Verses in Ebony || 1975 || A Rhyme of Faring Town ||  ||  || 
|-
| L'Envoi (1) || 12 || Live like a wolf then || The Right Hook, vol. 1, #1 || 1925-03-21 Spring 1925 ||  ||  ||  || 
|-
| L'Envoi (2) || 8 || Harlots and choir girls || The Right Hook, vol. 1, #2 || 1925-03-22 1925 ||  ||  ||  || 
|-
| L'Envoi (3) || 7 || Twilight striding o'er the mountain || The Right Hook, vol. 1, #3 || 1925-03-23 1925 || Twilight Striding O'er the Mountain ||  ||  || 
|-
| L'Envoi (4) || 12 || Now flapper ridden  ||  ||  ||  ||  || From KING BAHTHUR'S COURT, a play written entirely in verse in an undated letter to Tevis Clyde Smith || 
|-
| Lesbia (1) || 56 || From whence this grim desire? || The Last of the Trunk Och Brev I Urval || 2007-03 Mar 2007 ||  ||  Wikisource || Earlier version than (2) ; Letter: Tevis Clyde Smith, c. June 1928 ; PD; the first two appearances were shorter by a few lines, and a couple words different || 
|-
| Lesbia (2) || 56 || From whence this grim desire? || Desire and Other Erotic Poems || 1989 ||  ||  || Later version than (1) ; the first two appearances were shorter by a few lines, and a couple words different || 
|-
|  Let it rest with the ages mysteries  || 4 || Let it rest with the ages mysteries || The Collected Letters of Robert E. Howard, Volume 2: 1930-1932 || 2007-10 Oct 2007 || Untitled: Let it rest with the ages mysteries ||   ||  Letter: Tevis Clyde Smith, c. November 1931 ; Not actually written by Howard, but a quote from WHERE CANNIKANS CLINKED by Charles Nichols Webb, which, to confuse matters, Robert Louis Stevenson also cited in a poem || 
|-
| "Let me dream by a silver stream" || 4 || Let me dream by a silver stream || The Collected Letters of Robert E. Howard, Volume 3: 1933-1936 || 2008 || Untitled: ("Let me dream by a silver stream") ||  || Letter: Tevis Clyde Smith, undated || Did NOT get included in the first edition of COLLECTED POETRY 
|-
|  Let me live as I was born to live  || 4 || Let me live as I was born to live || The Collected Letters of Robert E. Howard, Volume 1: 1923-1929 || 2007-06 Jun 2007 || Untitled: Let me live as I was born to live ||   Wikisource || Letter: Tevis Clyde Smith, c. November 1928 ; PD || 
|-
| Let the Gods Die || 16 || Shatter the shrines and let the idols fall || Weirdbook #10 || 1976 ||  ||  ||  || 
|-
|  Let us up in the hills ... ||  || Let us up in the hills ... || Lewd Tales || 1987 || Untitled: Let us up in the hills ... ||  || Letter: Tevis Clyde Smith, c. March 1929 ; From: Songs of Bastards, Act 1, Scene 2 || 
|-
| Libertine || 4 || I set my soul to a wild lute  || The Last of the Trunk Och Brev I Urval || 2007-03 Mar 2007 ||  ||  Wikisource || Letter: Tevis Clyde Smith, June 23, 1926 ; PD || 
|-
| Lies, The || 23 || Nothing from us can you gain, say the Lies || A Rhyme of Salem Town and Other Poems || 2002 ||  ||  ||  || 
|-
| Life (1) || 14 || About me rise the primal mists || The Collected Letters of Robert E. Howard, Volume 1: 1923-1929 || 2007-06 Jun 2007 ||  ||  || Letter: Tevis Clyde Smith, c. January 1928 ; PD || 
|-
| Life (2) || 24 || They bruised my soul with a proverb || The Howard Collector #18 || 1973-09-21 Autumn 1973 || Youth Spoke - Not in Anger ||  Wikisource || Letter: R. H. Barlow, June 14, 1934  || 
|-
|  Life is a cynical, romantic pig  || 5 || Life is a cynical, romantic pig || The Collected Letters of Robert E. Howard, Volume 2: 1930-1932 || 2007-10 Oct 2007 || Untitled: Life is a cynical, romantic pig ||   Wikisource || Letter: Tevis Clyde Smith, c. February 1930 ; PD || 
|-
| "Life is a ladder ..." || 4 || Life is ladder of cynical years || A Rhyme of Salem Town and Other Poems || 2002 || Ladder of Life, The; Untitled ("Life is a ladder ...") ||  || Tentative title  || 
|-
|  Life is a lot of hooey  || 4 || Life is a lot of hooey || Lewd Tales || 1987 || Untitled: Life is a lot of hooey ||  || Letter: Tevis Clyde Smith, c. March 1929 ; From: Songs of Bastards, Act 2, Scene 1 || 
|-
| Life is the same ..." || 5 || Life is the same, yet of many phases || Unaussprechlichen Kulten #2 || 1992-07 Jul 1992 || Phases of Life, The; Untitled ("Life is the same ...") ||  || Tentative title ; French  || 
|-
| Lilith || 16 || They hurled me from the mire || The Ghost Ocean and Other Poems of the Supernatural || 1982 ||  ||  || Letter: Tevis Clyde Smith, c. October 1927  || 
|-
| Limericks to Spank By || 15 || There was a young girl from Siberia || Desire and Other Erotic Poems || 1989 || Untitled ("There was a young girl from Siberia") ||  || Tentative title ; Three 5-line limericks  || 
|-
| Lines to G. B. Shaw || 16 || Oh, G.B.S., oh, G.B.S || The Last of the Trunk Och Brev I Urval || 2007-03 Mar 2007 ||  ||  Wikisource || Letter: Tevis Clyde Smith, c. November 1932 ; PD || 
|-
| Lines Written in the Realization That I Must Die || 24 || The Black Door gapes and the Black Wall rises || Weird Tales || 1938-08 Aug 1938 ||  ||  "Lines Written in the Realization That I Must Die" ||  || 
|-
| Lion of Tiberias, The || 4 || The rider on the wind with stars in his hair || Echoes From An Iron Harp || 1972 ||  ||  || Epigraph: The Lion of Tiberias  || 
|-
|  Listlessness  ||  ||  || n/a || n/a ||  ||  || Lost || Thom, Herman & Woods, § C
|-
| Little Bell of Brass || 23 || Tingle, jungle, dingle, tingle, hear my brazen tones || A Rhyme of Salem Town and Other Poems || 2002 || Untitled ("Tingle, jingle, dingle, tingle ...") ||  || Tentative title  || 
|-
| Little Brown Man of Nippon || 36 || Little brown man of Nippon who apes the ways of the West || A Rhyme of Salem Town and Other Poems || 2002 || Untitled ("Little brown man from Nippon ...") ||  || Tentative title ; Letter: Tevis Clyde Smith, c. April 1932  || 
|-
|  Living Marble  ||  ||  || n/a || n/a ||  ||  || Lost || Thom, Herman & Woods, § C
|-
|  Lizzen my children and you shall be told  || 6 || Lizzen my children and you shall be told || Robert E. Howard: Selected Letters: 1923-1930 || 1989-10 Oct 1989 || Untitled: Lizzen my children and you shall be told ||  || Letter: Tevis Clyde Smith, c. September 1931  || 
|-
| Long Ago (1)||  ||  || Writer of the Dark || 1986 ||  ||  ||  || Somewhat different from version 2; last line is "Saw you, lighting with surprize." ||
|-
| Long Ago (2)|| 14 || Long ago, long ago || Writer of the Dark || 1986 ||  ||  || Somewhat different from version 1; last line is "Ah, the rose in your dark hair." || 
|-
| "Long ere Priapus ..." || 14 || Long ere Priapus pranced through groves Arcadian sunlight kissed || Always Comes Evening || 1957 || Gods of Easter Island, The; Untitled ("Long ere Priapus ...") ||  "The Gods of Easter Island" || Originally untitled  || 
|-
| "Long were the years ..." || 22 || Long were the years, lifelong and deathly-bare || Shadows of Dreams || 1989 || Ecstasy of Desolation, The; Untitled ("Long were the years, life-long and deathly-bare. ...") ||  || Letter: Tevis Clyde Smith, c. October 1928  || 
|-
| Longfellow Revised || 12 || Tell me not in senseless numbers || A Rhyme of Salem Town and Other Poems || 2002 ||  ||  ||  || 
|-
|  Longing  ||  ||  || n/a || n/a ||  ||  || Lost || Thom, Herman & Woods, § C
|-
|  The Long Trail  ||  ||  || n/a || n/a ||  ||  || Lost || Thom, Herman & Woods, § C
|-
| Lost Altars || 4 || Dust on column and carven frieze || Wayfarer #4 || 1969 ||  ||  ||  || 
|-
|  Lost Antiquity  ||  ||  || n/a || n/a ||  ||  || Lost || Thom, Herman & Woods, § C
|-
| Lost Galley, The || 28 || The sun was brazen in the sky || Singers in the Shadows || 1970 ||  ||  ||  || 
|- style="background:#E0E0E0;"
| Lost Mine, The ||  ||  ||  ||  || The Lost San Saba Mine ||  ||  || 
|-
| Lost San Saba Mine, The || 60 || Under the grim San Saba hills || A Rhyme of Salem Town and Other Poems || 2002 || The Lost Mine; Untitled: ("Under the grim San Saba hills") ||  || Letter: H. P. Lovecraft, April 23, 1933  || 
|-
| Love || 14 || I have felt your lips on mine || Shadows of Dreams || 1989 ||  ||  || Letter: Tevis Clyde Smith, c. January 1928  || 
|-
|  Love is singing soft and low  || 4 || Love is singing soft and low || The Last of the Trunk Och Brev I Urval || 2007-03 Mar 2007 || Untitled: Love is singing soft and low ||  Wikisource   || Letter: Tevis Clyde Smith, c. December 1928 ; PD || 
|-
| Love's Young Dream || 28 || I saw the evil red light gleam || Shadows of Dreams || 1989 ||  ||  ||  || 
|-
| Lunacy Chant || 32 || Hear the brazen bugles rattle || A Rhyme of Salem Town and Other Poems || 2002 ||  ||  ||  || 
|-
| Lust || 12 || I am a golden lure || The Last of the Trunk Och Brev I Urval || 2007-03 Mar 2007 ||  ||  Wikisource || Letter: Tevis Clyde Smith, June 23, 1926 ; PD || 
|-
| Mad Meg Gill || 44 || I found and altar in a misty land || Up John Kane! and Other Poems || 1977 ||  ||  ||  || 
|-
| Madame Goose's Rhymes || 41 || Hark, hark, the jackals bark || Fantasy Crossroads #7 || 1976-02 Feb 1976 || Untitled ("Hark, hark, the jackals bark ...) ||  || Tentative title  || 
|-
|  Madhouse Ballads  ||  ||  || n/a || n/a ||  ||  || Lost || Thom, Herman & Woods, § C
|-
| Madness of Cormac, The || 15 || Lock your arm of iron || The Last of the Trunk Och Brev I Urval || 2007-03 Mar 2007 ||  ||  Wikisource || Letter: Tevis Clyde Smith, undated ; PD || 
|-
| Mahomet ||  || Mahomet! Man of Mecca! || A Rhyme of Salem Town and Other Poems || 2002 || Untitled ("Mahomet! Man of Mecca!") ||  ||  || 
|-
| Maiden of Kercheezer, The || 20 || She was snoozing on her sweezer || The Progress || 1924-02-01 1 February 1924 ||  ||  Wikisource || PD || 
|-
| Man, A || 16 || I tore a pine from the mountain crag  || Raucher Sand und Wilde Eichen || 1993 ||  ||  || Letter: Tevis Clyde Smith, c. January 1928 ; German  || 
|-
| Man Am I || 18 || Man am I, and less than a beast, man, and more than a god || The Ghost Ocean and Other Poems of the Supernatural || 1982 ||  ||  ||  || 
|-
|  The Man in the Myth  ||  ||  || n/a || n/a ||  ||  || Lost; REH sent a copy of this poem to H. P. Lovecraft, who complimented it in a reply; the copy of the poem sent with the letter is also gone || Thom, Herman & Woods, § C
|-
| Man, The Master || 10 || I saw a man going down a long trail || Robert E. Howard Foundation Newsletter Volume 5 Number 3  || Fall 2011 || Song at Midnight (2) (SPURIOUS?) ||  Wikisource || PD  Alternative only mentioned in  || 
|-
| Mankind || 72 || The world has changed || A Rhyme of Salem Town and Other Poems || 2002 || Untitled ("The world has changed") ||  || Tentative title ; An early work  || 
|-
|  Many fell at the grog-shop wall || 2 || Many fell at the grog-shop wall || Robert E. Howard: Selected Letters: 1923-1930 || 1989-10 Oct 1989 || Untitled: Many fell at the grog-shop wall ||  || Letter: Tevis Clyde Smith, c. November 1931  || 
|-
| Marching Song of Connacht, The || 18 || The men of the East are decked in steel || The Howard Collector #16 || 1972 Spring 1972 ||  ||  || Letter: Tevis Clyde Smith, c. May 1930  || The version in the letter to TCS was fourteen lines long, later expanded to 18, and revised somewhat.  
|- style="background:#E0E0E0;"
| Marching Song of Connacht, The || 14 || The men of the East are decked in steel || ||  ||  ||  || 
|-
| Mark of the Beast || 24 || Kissing the lips of the morning  || Weirdbook #9 || 1975 || After a Flaming Night ||  || This poem is at the start of Act II, Scene ii of "Songs of Bastards"; From a letter to Tevis Clyde Smith, ca. March 1929 || Thom, Herman & Woods, § A
|-
|  Martin Luther  ||  ||  || n/a || n/a ||  ||  || Lost || Thom, Herman & Woods, § C
|-
| Master-Drum, The || 27 || The Master beat on his master-drum || Night Images || 1976 || Untitled ("The Master beat on his master-drum") ||  || Tentative title  || 
|- style="background:#E0E0E0;"
| "Master beat on his master-drum, The" ||  ||  ||  ||  ||  || ||
|-
|  Match a toad with a far-winged hawk  || 58 || Match a toad with a far-winged hawk || The Last of the Trunk Och Brev I Urval || 2007-03 Mar 2007 || Untitled: Match a toad with a far-winged hawk ||  Wikisource || Letter: Tevis Clyde Smith, c. undated ; PD || 
|-
| Mate of the Sea || 28 || The stars beat up from the shadowy sea || Always Comes Evening || 1957 || The Heart of the Sea's Desire ||  "The Heart of the Sea's Desire" || Title created by Dale Hart for an untitled version but another draft was later found with the title Mate of the Sea  || 
|-
| Medallions in the Moon || (331 words) || There is a gate whose portals are of opal and ivory, and to this gate I went one silent twilight ... || Etchings in Ivory (Chapbook) || 1968 ||  ||  || Third "prose poem" in the Etchings in Ivory cycle ||
|-
| Memories (1) || 24 || I rose in the path of a hurtling dawn and I heard the ocean say || Shangri L'Affaires || 1968-04-01  1 April 1968 ||  ||  ||  || 
|-
| Memories (2) || 16 || Shall we remember, friend of the morning || Fantasy Tales || 1988-09-21 Autumn 1988 ||  ||  || Letter: Tevis Clyde Smith, c. October 1927 ; British  || 
|-
| Memories of Alfred || 18 || Here in old time King Alfred broke the Danes || The Ghost Ocean and Other Poems of the Supernatural || 1982 ||  ||  || Tentative title  || 
|-
|  Men are toys on a godling's string ... || 4 || Men are toys on a godling's string ... || Lewd Tales || 1987 || Untitled: Men are toys on a godling's string ||  || Letter: Tevis Clyde Smith, c. March 1929 ; From: Songs of Bastards || 
|-
| Men Build Them Houses || 56 || Men build them houses on the street || Verses in Ebony || 1975 ||  ||  ||  || 
|-
| "Men I have slain with naked steel" || 24 || Men I have slain with naked steel || A Rhyme of Salem Town and Other Poems || 2002 || Sword of Lal Singh, The; Untitled (Men I have slain with naked steel) ||  || Tentative title ; An early work  || 
|-
| Men of the Shadows || 34 || From the dim red dawn of Creation || Always Comes Evening || 1957 || Untitled ("From the dim red dawn of Creation") ||  "Men of the Shadows" || From: Men of the Shadows ; Originally untitled  || 
|-
| "Men say my years are few; yet I am old" || 20 || Men say my years are few; yet I am old || Science-Fantasy Correspondent #1 || 1975-12 Dec 1975 || Guise of Youth, The; Untitled ("Men say my years ...") ||  || Tentative title  || 
|-
| Men That Walk with Satan || 24 || The men that walk with Satan, they have forgot their birth || Singers in the Shadows || 1970 ||  ||  ||  || 
|-
| The Mermaid || 5 7-line verses and a 6-line chorus repeated after each one || The first came up / Was a little cabin boy || The Collected Letters of Robert E. Howard, Volume 1: 1923-1929 || 2007-06 Jun 2007 || Oh, The Stormy Winds; Untitled: ("The first came up / Was a little cabin boy ...") || https://www.youtube.com/watch?v=BcAPJ77WfCs || Mnemonic reconstruction of an old folk song Letter: Robert W. Gordon, February 4, 1925; NOT INCLUDED IN COLLECTED POETRY ||
|-
|  A Mexican Girl  ||  ||  || n/a || n/a ||  ||  || Lost || Thom, Herman & Woods, § C
|-
| Mick in Israel, A || 32 || Old King Saul was a bold old scut || The Last of the Trunk Och Brev I Urval || 2007-03 Mar 2007 ||  ||  Wikisource || Letter: Tevis Clyde Smith, c. November 1932 ; PD || 
|-
| Mihiragula || 24 || Out of the East the stark winds rise || A Rhyme of Salem Town and Other Poems || 2002 ||  ||  || Letter: Harold Preece, c. October–November 1930  || 
|-
| Mine But to Serve || 91 || The moonlight glimmered white across the sands || A Rhyme of Salem Town and Other Poems || 2002 || Untitled ("The moonlight glimmered white ...") ||  || Tentative title  || 
|-
|  Mingle my dust with the burning brand  || 12 || Mingle my dust with the burning brand || The Collected Letters of Robert E. Howard, Volume 1: 1923-1929 || 2007-06 Jun 2007 || Untitled: Mingle my dust with the burning brand ||  Wikisource || Letter: Tevis Clyde Smith, c. August 28, 1925 ; PD || 
|-
| Miser's Gold || 14 || "Nay, have no fear. The man was blind," said she || Fantasy Crossroads #8 || 1976-05 May 1976 ||  ||  Wikisource ||  || 
|-
|  Mississippi Gals || 30 lines—one missing from source || Come all you Mississippi girls and listen to my noise ... || The Collected Letters of Robert E. Howard, Volume 1: 1923-1929 || 2007-06 Jun 2007 || ||  || Mnemonic reconstruction; virtually identical to original; Letter: Robert W. Gordon, March 17, 1927; NOT INCLUDED IN COLLECTED POETRY ||
|-
| "Mist and madness and mockery rule" || 4 || Mist and madness and mockery rule || THE COLLECTED LETTERS OF ROBERT E. HOWARD, VOLUME 2: 1930–1932 || 2007 || Untitled: ("Mist and madness and mockery rule") || ||  Letter: From a letter to Tevis Clyde Smith, ca. May 1930 || INADVERTENTLY LEFT OUT OF COLLECTED POETRY
|-
| Misty Sea, A || 6 || There is a misty sea beneath the earth || A Rhyme of Salem Town and Other Poems || 2002 || Untitled ("There is a misty sea ...") ||  || Tentative title  || 
|-
| Modest Bill || 132 || Back in the summer of '69 || A Rhyme of Salem Town and Other Poems || 2002 ||  ||  || An early work  || 
|-
| Moment, A || 16 || Let me forget all men a space || The Howard Collector #13 || 1970-09-21 Autumn 1970 ||  ||  ||  || 
|-
| Monarchs || 4 || These be kings of men || The Cross Plainsman || 2004-08 Aug 2004 ||  ||  Wikisource || Letter: Tevis Clyde Smith, June 23, 1926 ; PD || 
|-
| The Moon ||  ||  || n/a || n/a ||  ||  || Lost || Thom, Herman & Woods, § C
|-
| "The moon above the Kerry hills ..." || 22 || The moon above the Kerry hills ||  Always Comes Evening || 1957 || Retribution; Black Michael's Story; The Song of Murtagh O'Brien; Untitled ("The moon above the Kerry hills ...") ||  "Retribution" || Titled Retribution from an untitled draft, Howard's original title The Song of Murtagh O'Brien was found on a later copy  || 
|-
| Moon Mockery || 14 || I walked in Tara's Wood one summer night || Weird Tales || 1929-04 Apr 1929 ||  ||  Wikisource || PD || 
|-
| Moon Shame || 34 || The great black tower rose to split the stars || Always Comes Evening || 1957 || The Moon Woman; Voices of the Night ||  "Moon Shame" || Verse 4 of Voices of the Night ; Two drafts exist ; Letter: Tevis Clyde Smith, undated  || 
|-style="background:#E0E0E0;"
| Moon Woman, The ||  ||  ||  ||  || Moon Shame ||  ||  || 
|-
|  Moonlight and shadows barred the land  || 8 || Moonlight and shadows barred the land || The Last of the Trunk Och Brev I Urval || 2007-03 Mar 2007 || Untitled: Moonlight and shadows barred the land ||   Wikisource || Letter: Tevis Clyde Smith, c. late 1928 ; PD || 
|-
| "The moonlight glimmered white ..." || 91 || The moonlight glimmered white across the sands || A Rhyme of Salem Town and Other Poems || 2002 || Mine But to Serve; Untitled ("The moonlight glimmered white ...") ||  || Tentative title  || 
|-
| Moonlight on a Skull || 16 || Golden goats on a hillside black || Weird Tales || 1933-05 May 1933 || Futility ||  "Moonlight on a Skull" || Letter: Tevis Clyde Smith, c. November 1931 ; Similar to Futility  || 
|-
| Moor Ghost, The || 16 || They haled him to the crossroads || Weird Tales || 1929-09 Sep 1929 ||  ||  Wikisource || PD || 
|-
| "Moses was our leader ..." || 64 + a 12-line revision || Moses was our leader || Shadows of Dreams || 1989 || Odyssey of Israel, The; Untitled ("Moses was our leader ...") ||  || Letter: Tevis Clyde Smith, c. March 1926 ; In multiple parts, part of a projected longer work  || 
|-
|  Mother Eve, Mother Eve, I name you a fool  || 4 || Mother Eve, Mother Eve, I name you a fool || The Collected Letters of Robert E. Howard, Volume 1: 1923-1929 || 2007-06 Jun 2007 || Untitled: Mother Eve, Mother Eve, I name you a fool ||   Wikisource  || Letter: Tevis Clyde Smith, c. January 1928 ; PD || 
|-
| Mottoes of the Boy Scouts, The || 16 || If you lie not on the grass || The Last of the Trunk Och Brev I Urval || 2007-03 Mar 2007 ||  ||  Wikisource || Letter: Tevis Clyde Smith, c. Aug/Sep 1927 ; PD || 
|-
| Mountains of California, The || 12 || Grass and the rains and snow || The Last of the Trunk Och Brev I Urval || 2007-03 Mar 2007 ||  ||  Wikisource || Letter: Tevis Clyde Smith, June 23, 1926 ; PD || 
|-
|  Murky the night  || 7 || Murky the night || A Rhyme of Salem Town and Other Poems || 2002 || Untitled: Murky the night ||  || Unfinished  || 
|-
| Musings (1) || 10 || The little poets sing of little things || Witchcraft & Sorcery #5 || 1971-01 Jan-February 1971 ||  ||  ||  || 
|-
| Musings (2) || 12 || To every man his trade || Shadows of Dreams || 1989 ||  ||  || Letter: Tevis Clyde Smith, c. November 1932  || 
|-
|  My brother he was an auctioneer  || 56 || My brother he was an auctioneer || The Last of the Trunk Och Brev I Urval || 2007-03 Mar 2007 || Untitled: My brother he was an auctioneer ||   Wikisource  || Letter: Tevis Clyde Smith, c. November–December 1928 ; PD || 
|-
| "My brothers are blond and calm of speech" || 16 || My brothers are blond and calm of speech || Verses in Ebony || 1975 || Alien; Untitled ("My brothers are blond and calm of speech") ||  ||  Tentative title ||   Thom, Herman & Woods, § A
|-
| My Children || 18 || Now God be thanked that gave me flesh and thew || The Last of the Trunk Och Brev I Urval || 2007-03 Mar 2007 ||  ||  Wikisource || Letter: Tevis Clyde Smith, c. December 1928 ; PD || 
|-
| My empty skull is full of dust || 56 || My empty skull is full of dust || Shadows of Dreams || 1989 || A Poet's Skull ||  || Letter: Tevis Clyde Smith, undated  || 
|-
| "My heart is a silver drum tonight" || 14 || My heart is a silver drum tonight || Shadows of Dreams || 1989 || Call of Pan, The; Untitled ("My heart is a silver drum tonight") ||  || Letter: Tevis Clyde Smith, c. November 1928  || Thom, Herman & Woods, § C
|-
| "My name is Baal ..." || 57 || My name is Baal; I walked the earth of yore || A Rhyme of Salem Town and Other Poems || 2002 || Baal; Untitled ("My name is Baal ...") ||  || Tentative title  || Thom, Herman & Woods, § B
|-
|  My Old Beaver Cap  || 48 lines, with a 2-line refrain repeated twelve times || I'll sing you a song as I go long || The Collected Letters of Robert E. Howard, Volume 1: 1923-1929 || 2007-06 Jun 2007 || || https://www.loc.gov/collections/todd-and-sonkin-migrant-workers-from-1940-to-1941/?q=beaver+cap || Mnemonic reconstruction of a folk song; Letter: Robert W. Gordon, February 15, 1926; NOT INCLUDED IN COLLECTED POETRY ||
|-
| My Sentiments Set to Jazz ||  || Tum, tum, slam the drum! || The Right Hook, vol. 1, #3 || 1925-03-23 1925 ||  ||  ||  || 
|-
| Mysteries, The || 14 ||  || Yesteryear #4 || 1989-10 Oct 1989 ||  ||  || Letter: Tevis Clyde Smith, c. February 1929 ; Cycle of three poems: "The Invocation" (4 lines), "The Chorus of the Chant" (2 lines), and "The Sacrifice" (8 lines) || 
|-
| Mystic || 7 || There is a strange and mystic land || The Last of the Trunk Och Brev I Urval || 2007-03 Mar 2007 ||  ||  Wikisource  || Letter: Tevis Clyde Smith, June 23, 1926 ; PD || 
|-
| Mystic Lore || 4 || A wizard who dwelt by Drumnakill || A Rhyme of Salem Town and Other Poems || 2002 || Untitled ("A wizard who dwelt in Drumnakill") ||  || Tentative title  || 
|-
| Myth, The || 24 || Sages have said we leave our sex on earth || Desire and Other Erotic Poems || 1989 ||  ||  ||  || 
|-
| Nancy Hawk - A Legend of Virginity || 148 || Nancy Hawk spread wide her knees || The Last of the Trunk Och Brev I Urval || 2007-03 Mar 2007 ||  ||  Wikisource  || Letter: Tevis Clyde Smith, c. November 1928 ; PD || 
|-
| Native Hell || 20 || As I was born in the slaughter yards || A Rhyme of Salem Town and Other Poems || 2002 ||  ||  ||  || 
|-
| Nectar || 24 || Where I stand at the gates of Paradise || The Junto || 1929-09 Sep 1929 ||  ||  ||  || 
|-
| Negro Girl, A  || 8 || Favored child of a lucky star, born in a tolerant land || Desire and Other Erotic Poems || 1989 ||  ||  ||  || 
|-
| Nelly Till (?) || 24 || Down by the cane brake ... || The Collected Letters of Robert E. Howard, Volume 1: 1923-1929 || 2007-06 Jun 2007 || || http://pancocojams.blogspot.com/2013/09/down-in-canebrake-lyrics-sound-file.html || Mnemonic reconstruction of "Down by the Canebrake" (aka "Nancy Gill," "Come, Love, Come"); Letter: Robert W. Gordon, April 9, 1926; NOT INCLUDED IN COLLECTED POETRY ||
|-
| Neolithic Love Song || 8 || Fast fall the years as / Leaves of the autumn time || Neolithic Love Song || 1987 ||  ||  || Letter: Tevis Clyde Smith, June 8, 1923  || 
|-
| Never Beyond the Beast || 16 || Rise to the peak of the ladder || The Ghost Ocean and Other Poems of the Supernatural || 1982 || Untitled ("Rise to the peak of the ladder") ||  || Tentative title  || 
|-
| Niflheim || 34 || Grim land of death, what monstrous visions lurk || Always Comes Evening || 1957 ||  ||  ||  || 
|-
|  A Nigger Is Hanged  ||  ||  || n/a || n/a ||  ||  || Lost || Thom, Herman & Woods, § C
|-
| Night ||  ||  || n/a || n/a ||  ||  || Lost; two different versions listed, one 24 lines, one 32 lines || Thom, Herman & Woods, § C
|-
| "Night falls" || 18 || Night falls || Weirdbook #11 || 1977 || Nocturne; Untitled ("Night falls") ||  || Tentative title  || 
|-
| "Night in the county of Donegal" || 28 || Night in the county of Donegal || A Rhyme of Salem Town and Other Poems || 2002 || Farewell, Proud Munster; Untitled ("Night in the county of Donegal") ||  || Tentative title ; An early work  || 
|-
| Night Mood || 8 || It is my mood to walk in silent streets || Singers in the Shadows || 1970 || Night-Mood ||  ||  || 
|-
| The Night the Nanette Sank ||  ||  || n/a || n/a ||  ||  || Lost || Thom, Herman & Woods, § C
|-
| Night Winds, The || 32 || The night winds whisper across the grass || Verses In Ebony || 1975 || Untitled ("The night winds whisper ...") ||  || Tentative title  || 
|-
| "The night winds whisper ..." || 32 || The night winds whisper across the grass || Verses In Ebony || 1975 || Night Winds, The; Untitled ("The night winds whisper ...") ||  || Tentative title  || 
|-
| Nights to Both of Us Known || 28 || The nights we walked among the stars || Shadows of Dreams || 1989 ||  ||  || Letter: Tevis Clyde Smith, c. June 1928  || 
|-
| Nisapur || 20 || The day that towers, sapphire kissed || Always Comes Evening || 1957 || Untitled ("The day that towers ...") ||  "Nisapur" || Originally untitled  || 
|-
| No Man's Land || 28 || Across the wastes of No Man's Land, the grey-clad slayers came || A Rhyme of Salem Town and Other Poems || 2002 || Untitled ("Across the wastes of No Man's Land ...") ||  || Tentative title  || 
|-
| No More the Serpent Prow || 8 || The House of Asgard passes with the night || The Howard Collector #14 || 1971-03-21 Spring 1971 || Untitled ("The House of Asgaard passes ...") ||  || Originally untitled  || 
|-
| "'No more!' they swear ..." || 10 || "No more!" they swear; I laugh to hear them speak || The Howard Collector #18 || 1973-09-21 Autumn 1973 || Legacy of Tubal-Cain, The; Untitled ("'No more!' they swear ...") ||  || Originally untitled  || 
|-
| Noah was my applesauce || 24 || Noah was my applesauce || The Collected Letters of Robert E. Howard, Volume 1: 1923-1929 || 2007-06 Jun 2007 || Untitled: Noah was my applesauce ||   Wikisource  || Letter: Tevis Clyde Smith, c. November 1928 ; PD || 
|-
| Nocturne || 18 || Night falls || Weirdbook #11 || 1977 || Untitled ("Night falls") ||  || Tentative title  || 
|-
| Not Only in Death They Die || 20 || The old man leaned on his rusty spade || Magazine of Horror #28 || 1969-07 Jul 1969 ||  ||  ||  PD  || 
|-
| Now and Then || 9 || Twas twice a hundred centuries ago || A Rhyme of Salem Town and Other Poems || 2002 || Untitled ("'Twas twice a hundred centuries ago") ||  || Tentative title ; Unfinished  || 
|-
| "Now anthropoid and leprous shadows lope" || 18 || Now anthropoid and leprous shadows lope || Amazing Stories || 1986-03 Mar 1986 || All Hallows Eve; Untitled ("Now anthropoid and leprous shadows lope") ||  || Tentative title  || Thom, Herman & Woods, § A
|-
|  Now bright, now red, the sabers sped among the  ... || 8 || Now bright, now red, the sabers sped among the || The Last of the Trunk Och Brev I Urval || 2007-03 Mar 2007 || Untitled: Now bright, now red, the sabers sped ||  Wikisource || Letter: Tevis Clyde Smith, June 23, 1923 ; PD || 
|-
| "Now come the days of high endeavor ..." || 98 || Now come the days of high endeavor and / The blare of brazen trumpets through the land.  || Shadows of Dreams || 1989 || A Fable for Critics; Untitled ("Now come the days of high endeavor ...") || || || Letter: Tevis Clyde Smith, ca. November–December 1928 || 
|-
| "Now hark to this tale of long ago" || 19 || Now hark to this tale of long ago || A Rhyme of Salem Town and Other Poems || 2002 || When Men Were Bold; Untitled ("Now hark to this tale of long ago") ||  || Tentative title ; An early work ; Unfinished  || 
|-
| "Now is a summer come out of the sea" || 24 || Now is a summer come out of the sea || Amra (vol. 2, no. 8) || 1959-11 Nov-December 1959 || But the Hills Were Ancient Then; Untitled ("Now is a summer come out of the sea") ||  Wikisource || Originally untitled ; Title created by George Scithers ; PD || Thom, Herman & Woods, § B
|-
| "Now that the kings have fallen" || 32 || Now that the kings have fallen || The Howard Collector #11 || 1969-03-21 Spring 1969 || Where Are Your Knights, Donn Othna?; Untitled ("Now that the kings have fallen") ||  || Originally untitled  || 
|-
| "Now the stars are all gleaming ..." || 32 || Now the stars are all gleaming || The Collected Letters of Robert E. Howard, Volume 1: 1923-1929 || 2007-06 Jun 2007 || Untitled: ("Now the stars are all gleaming ...") ||  || Mnemonic reconstruction Letter: Robert W. Gordon, May 14, 1928; Howard's rendition of "a song I heard once some time ago and have heard only once," sung to him by a "wandering willy" to whom he'd given a lift; NOT INCLUDED IN COLLECTED POETRY
|-
| Nun || 4 || I have anchored my ship to a quiet port || The Cross Plainsman || 2006-08 Aug 2006 ||  ||  Wikisource || Letter: Tevis Clyde Smith, June 23, 1926 ; PD || 
|-
| O the Brave Sea-Rover || 4 || Oh, the rover hides in Aves when he runs || A Rhyme of Salem Town and Other Poems || 2002 ||  || Untitled: O THE BRAVE SEA-ROVER || Tentative title ; An early work  || 
|-
| Oaks, The || 5 || The great grey oaks by the banks of the river || A Rhyme of Salem Town and Other Poems || 2002 || Untitled ("The great gray oaks ...") ||  || Tentative title  || 
|-
|  An Oath  ||  ||  || n/a || n/a ||  ||  || Lost || Thom, Herman & Woods, § C
|-
| Ocean-Thoughts || 19 || The strong winds whisper o'er the sea || The Cross Plainsman || 2006-08 Aug 2006 ||  ||  Wikisource || Letter: Tevis Clyde Smith, August 21, 1926 ; PD || 
|-
| Odyssey of Israel, The || 64 + a 12-line revision || Moses was our leader  || Shadows of Dreams || 1989 || Untitled ("Moses was our leader ...") ||  || Letter: Tevis Clyde Smith, c. March 1926 ; In multiple parts, part of a projected longer work  || 
|-
| "O'er lakes agleam ..." || 8 || O'er lakes agleam the old gods dream || Always Comes Evening || 1957 || Chant of the White Beard; Untitled ("O'er lakes agleam ...") ||  || From: Men of the Shadows ; Originally untitled ; From: Men of the Shadows  || Thom, Herman & Woods, § C
|-
| Oh, Babylon, Lost Babylon || 23 || Bab-ilu's women gazed upon our spears  ||  ||  || Empire's Destiny—minus one line || ||  Wikisource || "Empire's Destiny" is slightly different, one line longer; the appearance in NIGHT IMAGES is the first complete appearance; PD; Pen name: Patrick Howard || 
|-
|  Oh, the road to glory lay  || 4 || Oh, the road to glory lay || n/a || n/a || Untitled: Oh, the road to glory lay ||  || From: The Pit of the Serpent (attributed to Mushy Hansen) ; Never published separately  || 
|-
| Oh, The Stormy Winds || 5 7-line verses and a 6-line chorus repeated after each one || The first came up / Was a little cabin boy || The Collected Letters of Robert E. Howard, Volume 1: 1923-1929 || 2007-06 Jun 2007 || The Mermaid; Untitled: ("The first came up / Was a little cabin boy ...") || https://www.youtube.com/watch?v=BcAPJ77WfCs || Mnemonic reconstruction of an old folk song Letter: Robert W. Gordon, February 4, 1925; NOT INCLUDED IN COLLECTED POETRY ||
|-
|  Oh, we are little children marching on to Hell! || 2 || Oh, we are little children marching on to Hell! ||  ||  || Untitled: Oh, we are little children marching on to Hell! ||  || Letter: Tevis Clyde Smith, c. November 1928 ; From: People of the Winged Skulls  || 
|-
| "Oh, ye who tread the narrow way" || 4 || Oh, ye who tread the narrow way || A Rhyme of Salem Town and Other Poems || 2002 || Exhortation''' Untitled ("Oh, ye who tread the narrow way") ||  || Tentative title ; An early work  || 
|-
| Old Ballad || 12 || They trapped the Lion on Shamu's plain || Always Comes Evening || 1957 || One of 5 chapter headings for the CONAN tale "The Scarlet Citadel" ||  || Epigraph: The Scarlet Citadelt  || 
|-
| An Old Border Ballad || 5 || Mike O'Mara rode up from Sonora  || The Vultures || 1973 || ||    Embedded in the story "Showdown at Hell's Canyon" (aka "The Judgment of the Desert"); possible mnemonic reconstruction, but as yet, no antecedent has been found ||
 || 
|-
|  Old Faro Bill was a man of might  || 20 || Old Faro Bill was a man of might || The Collected Letters of Robert E. Howard, Volume 1: 1923-1929 || 2007-06 Jun 2007 || Untitled: Old Faro Bill was a man of might ||  Wikisource || Letter: Tevis Clyde Smith, c. November 1928 ; PD || 
|-
| Old Gods Brood, The || 44 || The mallet clashes on the nail ||Fantasy Book #21 || September 1986 || And Man Was Given the Earth to Rule; For Man Was Given the Earth to Rule ||  || Listed as "And . . ." in Fantasy Book;"The Old Gods Brood" is from Glenn Lord's title to an untitled typescript. || || 
|- 
| Old Ones, The || 8 || They lumber through the night || Echoes From An Iron Harp || 1972 || The Thing on the Roof; Out of the Old Land ||  || Justin Geoffrey ; This is the published title, The Old Ones was the draft title, from The Thing on the Roof || 
|-
| Old Rime || 3 || One fled ||  ||  || Rogues in the House (verse heading) || || This poem has only appeared with the story || 
|-
|  On the Beach  ||  ||  || n/a || n/a ||  ||  || Lost || Thom, Herman & Woods, § C
|-
|  On the Lakes of the Pontchartrain || 16 || I asked her if she'd marry me || The Collected Letters of Robert E. Howard, Volume 1: 1923-1929 || 2007-06 Jun 2007 || || https://www.youtube.com/watch?v=Ad8RVexRUoQ || Mnemonic reconstruction of an old folk song; Letter: Robert W. Gordon, February 15, 1926; NOT INCLUDED IN COLLECTED POETRY ||
|-
|  On the Lakes of the Pontchartrain || 12 || 'Twas on one bright March morning || A Means to Freedom: The Letters of H. P. Lovecraft and Robert E. Howard  Volume 2: 1930–1932 ||  2011 || || https://www.youtube.com/watch?v=Ad8RVexRUoQ || Mnemonic reconstruction of an old folk song; Letter: H. P. Lovecraft, ca. October 1932; NOT INCLUDED IN COLLECTED POETRY ||
|-
| On With the Play || 14 || Up with the curtain, lo, the stage is set || The Howard Collector #17 || 1972-09-21 Autumn 1972 || Untitled ("Up with the curtain, lo, ...") ||  || Originally untitled  || 
|-
| One Black Stain, The || 45 || They carried him out on the barren sand where the rebel captains died || The Howard Collector #2 || 1962-03-21 Spring 1962 ||  ||  Wikisource || A Solomon Kane poem; PD || 
|-
| One Blood Strain || 22 || Now autumn comes and summer goes || The Collected Letters of Robert E. Howard, Volume 2: 1930-1932 || 2007-10 Oct 2007 ||  ||  Wikisource || Letter: Tevis Clyde Smith, c. September 1932   PD || 
|-
| "One slept beneath the branches dim" || 44 || One slept beneath the branches dim || Red Shadows || 1968 || Return of Sir Richard Grenville, The; Untitled ("One slept beneath the branches dim") ||  || Originally untitled ; A Solomon Kane poem || 
|-
| One Who Comes at Eventide || 16 || I think when I am old a furtive shape || Modern American Poetry || 1933 ||  ||  Wikisource || PD || 
|-
| Only a Shadow on the Grass || 4 || The tribes of men rise up and pass || Weirdbook #13 || 1978 || Untitled ("The tribes of men rise up and pass") ||  || Tentative title  || 
|-
| Open Window, An || 4 || Beyond the Veil what gulfs of Time and Space? || Weird Tales || 1932-09 Sep 1932 ||  ||  "An Open Window" || From: The House in the Oaks ; Justin Geoffrey  || 
|-
| Open Window, The || 20 || I remember my sister Eve || A Rhyme of Salem Town and Other Poems || 2002 ||  ||  || Pen name: Patrick Howard  || 
|-
| Opium Dream, An || 100 || God is God and Mahommed his prophet || Altars and Jesters; Opium Dream, A || 1974 || Altars and Jesters ||  ||  || Thom, Herman & Woods, § A
|-
| Orientia || 14 || Castinet, castanet! / When the floating sun has set || The Last of the Trunk Och Brev I Urval || 2007-03 Mar 2007 ||  ||  Wikisource || Letter: Tevis Clyde Smith, June 23, 1926 ; PD || 
|-
|  Out in front of Goldstein's  || 8, plus seven additional 2-line choruses—22 lines total || Out in front of Goldstein's || The Last of the Trunk Och Brev I Urval || 2007-03 Mar 2007 || Untitled: Out in front of Goldstein's  ||   Wikisource  || Letter: Tevis Clyde Smith, c. December 1928 ; In addition to the opening 8-line song parody of "East Side, West Side (The Sidewalks of New York)," there are also seven two-line choruses scattered throughout the letter; PD || 
|-
|  Out of Asia the tribesmen came  || 4 || Out of Asia the tribesmen came || The Cross Plainsman || 2004-08 Aug 2004 || Untitled: Out of Asia the tribesmen came ||   Wikisource  || Letter: Tevis Clyde Smith, July 30, 1923 ; PD;  || 
|- 
| Out of the Deep  || 24 || The blind black shadows reach inhuman arms || The Fantasy Fan || 1934-09 Sep 1934 || A Drum Begins to Throb; Voices Waken Memory, The ||  Wikisource || PD; Part 1 of the Voices of the Night cycle || 
|-
| Out of the Old Land || 8 || They lumber through the night || Echoes From An Iron Harp || 1972 || The Thing on the Roof; The Old Ones ||  || Justin Geoffrey ; This is the published title, The Old Ones was the draft title, from The Thing on the Roof || 
|-
| "Out of the Texas desert ..." || 31 || Out of the Texas desert, over the Rio Grande || A Rhyme of Salem Town and Other Poems || 2002 || Bandit, The; Untitled ("Out of the Texas desert ...") ||  || Tentative title ; An early work  || Thom, Herman & Woods, § B
|-
|  The Outbound Trail  ||  ||  || n/a || n/a ||  ||  || Lost || Thom, Herman & Woods, § C
|-
| Outcast, The || 12 || Forth from the purple and feats of the palace || The Grim Land and Others || 1976 || Untitled ("Forth from the purple ...") ||  || Tentative title  || 
|-
| Outgoing of Sigurd the Jerusalem-Farer, The || 23 || The fires roared in the skalli-hall || Verses in Ebony || 1975 ||  ||  ||  || 
|-
| Outworn Story, An || 21 || There come long days when the soul turns sick || Fantasy Tales || 1987-06-21 Summer 1987 || Untitled ("There come long days ...") ||  || Tentative title ; British  || 
|-
| "Over the hills the winds ..."  || 14 || Over the hills the winds of the seas || A Rhyme of Salem Town and Other Poems || 2002 || Winds of the Sea, The (1); Untitled ("Over the hills the winds ...") ||  || Tentative title  || 
|-
|"Over the hills the winds ..."  || 16 || Over the hills the winds of the seas || The Last of the Trunk Och Brev I Urval || 2007-03 Mar 2007 || Winds of the Sea, The (2); Untitled ("Over the hills the winds ...") ||  ||  || 
|-
| Over the Old Rio Grandey || 12 || Over the old Rio Grandey || A Rhyme of Salem Town and Other Poems || 2002 || Untitled ("Over the old Rio Grandey") ||  || Tentative title ; An early work  || 
|-
| "Over the place the lights go out" || 47 || Over the place the lights go out || Robert E. Howard's Fight Magazine #4 || 1996-10 Oct 1996 || In the Ring; Untitled ("Over the place the lights go out") ||  || Tentative title  || 
|}

Notes
Further explanations
  These publications/dates indicate where and when these headings were first published independently of the works to which they were originally attached. 
  These tentative titles were used by Glenn Lord as a means to identify the poems where no original title was available. 
  An early work is defined as one believed to have been written before 1924. 

Notes on publications
  The Tattler was the newspaper of Brownwood High School. 
  The Cross Plains Review is the weekly newspaper for Cross Plains, Texas. 
  The Yellow Jacket is the newspaper of Howard Payne College. 
  The Daniel Baker Collegian was the newspaper of Daniel baker College of Brownwood; the college has since merged with Howard Payne College. 
  The Junto was a literary travelogue circulated from member to member on a mailing list from 1928 to 1930. 
  The Golden Caliph (1922 or 1923, one issue) and The Right Hook (1925, three issues) were amateur magazines created by Robert E. Howard and Tevis Clyde Smith as teenagers. 
  The Progress was published by Cross Plains High School.

Notes on short hand
  All or part of these poems are from or were included in a letter from Robert E. Howard to some recipient (the date is either the explicit date on the letter, an approximate dating of the letter where possible or else simply marked undated).  e.g. "Letter: Tevis Clyde Smith, June 23, 1926" indicates that the poem is from a letter to Tevis Clyde Smith dated June 23, 1926.
  These poems are in the public domain in the United States and any country where the Rule of the Shorter Term applies. 
  With these poems, two or more sources give different publications and dates of the first appearance. e.g. "Conflict: , The Howard Collector, 1962/, The Junto, 1929" indicates that  states first publication as The Howard Collector (published in 1962), while  states first publication as The Junto (published in 1929).  Always listed with the earliest date first.
  Howard sometimes used the same title more than once, or the same title has been attached to untitled works by others.  In these cases the poems have been numbered to distinguish them.  e.g. "(2)" following the title indicates that this the second poem with the same name.
  These poems were published under a pen name.  e.g. "Pen name: Patrick Howard" indicated that the poem was published under the pen name Patrick Howard.
  These poems were first published in a non-American publication. e.g. "French" indicates that it was first published in a French book or magazine.
   These poems are attributed to "Justin Geoffrey," a fictional poet Howard created for his fiction.
  These poems were originally used as epigraphs, heading chapter and whole stories, in works of prose fiction.  This list shows where they were printed separately from the prose.  e.g. "Epigraph: The Phoenix on the Sword" indicates that the poem was used as an opening in the short story The Phoenix on the Sword.
  These poems were part of a different work, usually prose fiction, but were not used to open the work or head chapters.  This list shows where they were printed separately from the main work, if at all. e.g. "From: Men of the Shadows" indicates that this poem was originally included in, or part of, the short storyMen of the Shadows''.
  Poems with these titles are on record but no known copy exists today.

See also

 List of works by Robert E. Howard

References

Bibliographies

Other sources

External links

 
Bibliographies by writer
Poetry bibliographies
Bibliographies of American writers